Bovenendvankeelafsnysleegte is a farm located in the Upper Karoo in Northern Cape, South Africa, lying at an altitude of . It is one of the longest place names in the world. Its name is in Afrikaans and means "Upper end of throat-cut valley".

References

Farms in South Africa
Economy of the Northern Cape
Karoo